The Mercedes Junior Team is an initiative by the Mercedes-AMG F1 Team to help nurture talent from karts through the feeder series ladder to promote them to their Formula One team. All eligible drivers have been promoted to Formula One, with Pascal Wehrlein, Esteban Ocon and George Russell, the latter driving for Mercedes from 2022.

Current drivers

Former drivers

Notes

References 

Racing schools
Mercedes-Benz in Formula One